Kim Fowler from the Kansas State University, Manhattan, KS was named Fellow of the Institute of Electrical and Electronics Engineers (IEEE) in 2014 for contributions to mission-critical and safety-critical systems engineering.

References

External links
IEEE Explore Bio

Fellow Members of the IEEE
Living people
Year of birth missing (living people)
Place of birth missing (living people)
Kansas State University faculty
American electrical engineers